Flower Hill is an census designated place in Montgomery County, Maryland, United States. It has a population of 14,108 as of its first recording in the 2020 census.

Demographics

2020 census

Note: the US Census treats Hispanic/Latino as an ethnic category. This table excludes Latinos from the racial categories and assigns them to a separate category. Hispanics/Latinos can be of any race.

References

Census-designated places in Montgomery County, Maryland
Census-designated places in Maryland